The 1973 NCAA Division III football season, part of college football in the United States organized by the National Collegiate Athletic Association at the Division III level, began in August 1973, and concluded with the NCAA Division III Football Championship in December 1973 at Garrett–Harrison Stadium in Phenix City, Alabama. This was the first season for Division III (and Division II) football, which were formerly in the College Division in 1972 and prior.

Wittenberg won their first Division III championship, defeating  in the championship game by a score of 41−0.

Conference changes and new programs

Conference standings

Conference champions

Postseason
The 1973 NCAA Division III Football Championship playoffs were the first single-elimination tournament to determine the national champion of men's NCAA Division III college football. The inaugural edition had only four teams (in comparison with the 32 teams competing as of 2014). The championship game was held at Garrett-Harrison Stadium in Phenix City, Alabama. The Wittenberg Tigers defeated the Juniata College Eagles, 41−0, to win their first national title.

Playoff bracket

See also
1973 NCAA Division I football season
1973 NCAA Division II football season
1973 NAIA Division I football season
1973 NAIA Division II football season

References